Zhao Xin may refer to:

 Zhao Xin (speed skater, born 1992), Chinese 2014 Olympic speed skater, active since 2006; international since 2012
 Zhao Xin (speed skater, born 1980), (Chinese: 赵昕; born October 1980 or July 1978) Chinese former long track speed skater, active between 1998 and 2016; international 2003–2005
 Zhao Xin (general) (2nd-century BC), originally a marquis of Xiongnu heritage, previously surrendered to the Han Dynasty of China